Kano Pillars Basketball Club is a Nigerian basketball club based in Kano. The team plays in the Nigerian Premier League and holds the record for most championships with 6. The team has regularly played in the FIBA Africa Clubs Champions Cup, winning bronze in 1985 and 1987.

Honours
Nigerian Premier League
Champions (6): 2009, 2010, 2013, 2014, 2016, 2017
Runners-up (2): 2012, 2015

FIBA Africa Clubs Champions Cup
Third place (2): 1985, 1987
Fourth place: 2016

In African competitions
FIBA Africa Clubs Champions Cup  (9 appearances)

1985 – 3rd Place 
1987 – 3rd Place 
2005 – 5th Place

2010 – 5th Place
2012 – 9th Place
2013 – 9th Place

2015 – 7th Place
2016 – 4th Place
2017 – Preliminary Round

References

External links
Facebook page

Basketball teams in Nigeria